Pearlman is a surname. It is typically an Anglicized version of the Ashkenazi Jewish surname Perelman. Notable people with the surname include: 
Alan R. Pearlman, American engineer and entrepreneur, founder of ARP Instruments, Inc.
Adam Pearlman (born 2005), Canadian soccer player
Adam Pearlman, the birth name of Adam Yahiye Gadahn, American member of Al Qaeda.
Edith Pearlman (1936-2022), American writer
Ed Pearlman, an American cofounder of the National Off-Road Racing Association.
Jeff Pearlman, American writer, best known for his work on sports.
Jordan Walker-Pearlman, American film director, screenwriter and producer.
Lindsey Pearlman (1978-2022), American actress
Lou Pearlman, American record producer and fraudster.
Martin Pearlman (1945-2022), American music director.
Michael Pearlman, American actor and writer.
Richard Pearlman, American theater and opera director.
Sandy Pearlman, American music producer, songwriter, and record company executive.

See also
Perlman
Perelman

References